Gelliondale was a railway station on the South Gippsland line in South Gippsland, Victoria. The station was opened during the 1890s and operated until the 1970s.

Disused railway stations in Victoria (Australia)
Transport in Gippsland (region)
Shire of Wellington